Jonas Eriksson may refer to:
 Jonas Eriksson (biathlete) (born 1970), Swedish Olympic biathlon competitor
 Jonas Eriksson (referee) (born 1974), Swedish football referee
 Jonas Eriksson (politician) (born 1967), Swedish politician